Levir Culpi (born 28 February 1953) is a Brazilian professional football coach and former player who played as a centre-back.

Playing career
Known as Levir during his playing days, he was born in Curitiba, Paraná, and started his career with hometown club Coritiba, in 1972. After spending a six-month loan deal at Botafogo the following year, he signed for Santa Cruz in 1974.

Levir subsequently represented Colorado (two stints), Atlante, Vila Nova, Figueirense and Juventude, retiring with the latter in 1985.

Coaching career
Immediately after retiring Culpi took up coaching, starting with his last club Juventude. After a stint at Caxias he was named Atlético Paranaense head coach in 1986, but left the club in the following year.

After a period in charge of Marcílio Dias, Culpi took Internacional de Limeira to their second national title, a Campeonato Brasileiro Série B in 1988. He subsequently managed Criciúma, Internacional and Coritiba before returning to Criciúma in 1992 and taking the club to the quarterfinals of the 1992 Copa Libertadores (being knocked out by eventual champions São Paulo).

In the following years Culpi rarely settled into a club, being in charge of Al-Ittifaq, Paraná Clube, Guarani, Atlético Mineiro, Portuguesa and Cruzeiro before moving abroad to manage Cerezo Osaka in 1997. He returned to Cruzeiro in 1998, notably winning the year's Recopa Sudamericana with a 5–0 aggregate success over River Plate.

In January 2000 Culpi took over São Paulo, but was sacked in November. After spells at Sport and Atlético Mineiro in 2001, he replaced Flávio Murtosa at the helm of Palmeiras on 3 September 2002, but could not avoid the club's first-ever relegation from the top tier.

In December 2002 Culpi was appointed head coach of Botafogo, taking the club back to the main category after finishing second. On 27 April 2004 he returned to Atlético Paranaense, after resigning with Bota.

Culpi again managed Cruzeiro during the 2005 campaign, but was relieved from his duties in July of that year. He subsequently managed São Caetano before achieving another promotion with Atlético Mineiro in 2006.

In May 2007, J. League Division 2 side Cerezo Osaka sacked Satoshi Tsunami and appointed Culpi as head coach. During his spell in charge of the team, he discovered Shinji Kagawa, who then played as a defensive midfielder, and used him as an attacking midfielder. Kagawa combined well with Takashi Inui, another talented young player, and the team under Culpi were promoted to the J. League Division 1 in 2010. He continued to display his ability to develop young players and construct an attacking team. With such players as Kagawa, Inui, Akihiro Ienaga, Hiroshi Kiyotake, Adriano, and Martinez, the team finished 3rd in 2010 and qualified for the AFC Champions League.

In November 2011, Culpi decided not to extend his contract, saying "I've come to the conclusion that now is the time to return to the far distant Brazil and spend time with my family." The following 26 August, however, he returned to the club after replacing compatriot Sérgio Soares.

In April 2014, Levir Culpi was announced as Atlético Mineiro coach for the fourth time in his career. He managed to perform a double in 2014, winning both the Recopa Sudamericana and the Copa do Brasil. In 2015, in the first official match of the season, Atlético defeated Tupi 2-0 and he reached his 228th match ahead of the team, becoming the third coach with more games for the club, only behind Telê Santana (434), and Procópio Cardoso (328).

On 3 May 2015, Culpi lifted the Campeonato Mineiro trophy for the fifth time in his career, becoming the fifth coach to do so. He left Atlético Mineiro on 26 November, exactly one year after winning the Copa do Brasil. He was dismissed after a total of 288 matches, with 154 wins, 60 draws and 74 defeats, with 493 goals scored 184 goals conceded.

On 4 March 2016, Culpi was announced as new coach of Fluminense. He won the inaugural Primeira Liga, but was relieved from his duties on 6 November.

On 6 June 2017, Culpi agreed to a six-month contract with Santos, replacing fired Dorival Júnior. On 28 October, he was himself dismissed after a 2–1 loss against São Paulo.

On 17 October 2018, Culpi returned to Galo for his fifth spell, replacing dismissed Thiago Larghi. He was sacked the following 11 April, after a 4–1 loss against Cerro Porteño.

Coaching statistics

Honours

Player
Coritiba
Campeonato Paranaense: 1973

Santa Cruz
Campeonato Pernambucano: 1976

Manager
Inter de Limeira
Campeonato Brasileiro Série B: 1988

Criciúma
Campeonato Catarinense: 1989

Paraná
Campeonato Paranaense: 1993

Cruzeiro
Copa do Brasil: 1996
Campeonato Mineiro: 1996, 1998
Recopa Sudamericana: 1998
Copa Centro-Oeste: 1999

São Paulo
Campeonato Paulista: 2000

Atlético Mineiro
Campeonato Mineiro: 1995, 2007, 2015
Campeonato Brasileiro Série B: 2006
Recopa Sudamericana: 2014
Copa do Brasil: 2014

Fluminense
Primeira Liga: 2016

References

External links
 

1953 births
Living people
Footballers from Curitiba
Brazilian footballers
Association football defenders
Campeonato Brasileiro Série A players
Coritiba Foot Ball Club players
Botafogo de Futebol e Regatas players
Santa Cruz Futebol Clube players
Vila Nova Futebol Clube players
Figueirense FC players
Esporte Clube Juventude players
Liga MX players
Atlante F.C. footballers
Brazilian expatriate footballers
Brazilian expatriate sportspeople in Mexico
Expatriate footballers in Mexico
Brazilian football managers
Campeonato Brasileiro Série A managers
Campeonato Brasileiro Série B managers
Esporte Clube Juventude managers
Sociedade Esportiva e Recreativa Caxias do Sul managers
Club Athletico Paranaense managers
Clube Náutico Marcílio Dias managers
Associação Atlética Internacional (Limeira) managers
Criciúma Esporte Clube managers
Sport Club Internacional managers
Coritiba Foot Ball Club managers
Paraná Clube managers
Guarani FC managers
Clube Atlético Mineiro managers
Associação Portuguesa de Desportos managers
Cruzeiro Esporte Clube managers
São Paulo FC managers
Sport Club do Recife managers
Sociedade Esportiva Palmeiras managers
Botafogo de Futebol e Regatas managers
Associação Desportiva São Caetano managers
Fluminense FC managers
Santos FC managers
Ettifaq FC managers
J1 League managers
J2 League managers
Cerezo Osaka managers
Gamba Osaka managers
Expatriate football managers in Saudi Arabia
Brazilian expatriate football managers
Expatriate football managers in Japan